Acácio Pereira Magro (3 September 1932 – 6 April 2018) was a Portuguese academic, economist and politician.

Born in Lisbon on 3 September 1932, he studied Economics and Management at the Faculty of Sciences of the University of Lisbon. He was vice-president of the Banco Nacional Ultramarino. He was named Minister of Social Affairs in 1978 by Prime Minister Alfredo Nobre da Costa and later was in Carlos Alberto da Mota Pinto's government. He was appointed Minister of Commerce and Tourism on 1 August 1979 by Prime Minister Maria de Lourdes Pintasilgo.

He died on 6 April 2018 at the age of 85.

References 

1932 births
2018 deaths
20th-century Portuguese economists
Government ministers of Portugal
University of Lisbon alumni
People from Lisbon